The 2023 AFA Senior Male League is the 24th season of the AFA Senior Male League, the men's football league in Anguilla. The regular season began on 21 January.

Roaring Lions are the three-time defending champions.

Teams

Stadiums and locations 
Note: Table lists in alphabetical order.

Arriving clubs 
 None

Departing clubs 
 Kicks United
 Salsa Ballers

Regular season

Table

References

External links 
 2022 AFA Senior Male League at RSSSF

2023
2022–23 in Caribbean football leagues
2023–24 in Caribbean football leagues